Gondershe, also known as Gandershe or El Torre, is an ancient landmark on the Somali Sea, as well as a town, in the Lower Shabelle region of Southwest State of Somalia. It is noted for its various historical structures.

Overview

Gendershe (also known as; Gendershe, Gandarshe, Gonderscia and Gondeurcheikh) is situated about 35 kilometers northeast of Merca and about 45 kilometers southwest of Mogadishu.

It is an ancient stone city built on a coastal promontory. The town's ruins consist of typical Somali architecture, such as coral stone houses, fortifications, tombs and mosques. The town contains a shrine to Aw Garweyne.

The town is said to date from the medieval Ajuran period, when it became a center of trade that handled smaller vessels sailing from India, Arabia, Persia and the Far East. This is supported by early maps, and an initial archaeological survey.

Gondershe later evolved into a popular tourist attraction during the 1960s, 1970s and 1980s. The film La Conchiglia (1992) by the award-winning Somali filmmaker Abdulkadir Ahmed Said was also shot here, and features the town's local residents.

Inside Gendershe
Gendershe is 45 km along the coast from Mogadishu, on the east is the village of Dhanaane, the North is bordered by beautiful small valleys, the West is the bordered by Jilib marka and the South is the bordered by the Indian Ocean with rows of coconuts trees lined along Gendershe Beach and a type of tree known as 'Geedka Showri' which Gendershe is famous for.

There are thee main roads leading to Gendershe:

Jaziira Beach to Gendershe - (Currently Closed Off),

No.60 to Gendershe

Merca to Gendershe.

There are 8 villages (tuulo) within Gendershe these are:

1- Dooxa Qoryaale

2- Buulo Bishaar

3- Bocoreey

4- Timirteey

5- Yaaq-Bine

6- Cadeey Dheere

7- Aw-Caliyow

8- Maansaaleey

There is one school in Gendershe consisting of a primary school and middle school built by the previous government of President Mohamed Siad Barre. Since the Somali Civil War (2009–present) the school has been neglected. However, part of the school was rebuilt by UNHG a group of Gendershe natives currently residing in Norway.

Mosques
In Gendershe there are 4 main Mosques:

1- Jaamaca Mosque in Buulo Ceel

2- Nuuraani Mosque in Shacbaanka; the largest mosque in the area with two floors and a beautiful view.

3- Abiyo Abiikar Aw-asad in Buulo Hoose

4- Aw-Maki in Buulo Hoose

There are 3 other mosques in the area, however these have not received proper care and are now abandoned.

Inhabitants
Gendershe is mostly inhabited by people of the Sheekhaal tribe, who are the direct descendants of Patron Aw Garweyne. They are known more specifically as the 'Sheekhaal Gendershe' as well as the 'Reer Aw Garweyne' and 'Reer Cusmaan Faqi Cumar' (Abadir Umar ar-Rid)).

Notable Figures
Mohamed Sheekh Jamaal Cabdullahi AKA Jamaal jibiye - First Mayor of Mogadishu

Ugaas Cabdulqaadir Xussen - President of Sheekhaal Gendershe Clan

Maxamed Xusseen Cali (Shiiqaalow) - Somali National Football Player

Cabduraxmaan Sheekh Maxamed (Aw Koombe) - Comedian

Jaarlees Cadde - Comedian

Sheekh Maxamed Sh. Cabduraxmaan Abba Xaakji - First Teacher at Somali Youth League school.

Sheekh Cusmaan Sheekh Cabdiqaadir - First Somali Pilot

Maxamed Sheekh Aanis - Somali Singer

Amiinullaahi Maxamed Sh. Jamaal - First Translator for the Federal Parliament of Somalia

Sheekh Muxyidiin Sheekh Maxamed Sheekh Isaaq Al Gendershi - Qadi of Mogadishu

Maxamed Sheekh Cabdi Sheekh Cusmaan - Member of Federal Parliament of Somalia

See also
Hannassa
Essina
Sarapion

Notes and references

Archaeological sites in Somalia
Ajuran Sultanate
Jubaland
Banaadir
Ancient Somalia
Archaeological sites of Eastern Africa